John Edward South (born 8 April 1948) is an English retired professional football centre forward who made one appearance in the Football League for Brentford. In his subsequent career in non-league football, South spent nearly 10 years with Metropolitan Police.

Playing career

Brentford 
South began his career in the youth system at Fulham, before moving to West London rivals Brentford in November 1966. He made just two appearances before suffering a severe knee injury in training. In a period of financial uncertainty for the Griffin Park club, South was released as a cost-cutting measure at the end of the 1966–67 season.

Non-league football 
South dropped into non-league football to sign for Southern League Premier Division club Guildford City in 1967. After suffering further injury woes, he joined Metropolitan Police and stayed with the club for nearly a decade.

Personal life 
South's brother Ernie also played football and was a goalkeeper for the Brentford junior team.

Career statistics

References

1948 births
Footballers from Lambeth
English footballers
Brentford F.C. players
English Football League players
Fulham F.C. players
Guildford City F.C. players
Association football forwards
Metropolitan Police F.C. players
Southern Football League players
Isthmian League players
Living people